The Washington District Regiment was authorized on December 23, 1776 by the Province of North Carolina Congress.  It was subordinate to the Salisbury District Brigade of militia.  The regiment was renamed the Washington County Regiment.  The regiment was engaged in battles and skirmishes against the British and Cherokee during the American Revolution in Virginia, North Carolina, South Carolina, Tennessee, and Georgia between 1776 and 1782.  It was active until the end of the war.

History
The Washington District Regiment was established on December 23, 1776 by the North Carolina Provincial Congress.  Washington District became Washington County, North Carolina in 1777.  The regiment was renamed the Washington County Regiment on December 18, 1777.  The Washington District Regiment was part of the Salisbury District Brigade when it was created in 1776.  It was transferred to the newly created Morgan District Brigade in 1782.

After the war, Washington County, North Carolina became part of the Southwest Territory in 1790.  In 1779, Sullivan County was created by North Carolina from part of Washington County.  In 1783, Green County was created by North Carolina out of Washington County.  When Tennessee was admitted to the United States in 1796, Washington County became Washington County, Tennessee.  This county should not be confused with a separate location, Washington County, North Carolina created in 1799 from Tyrrell County.

Colonels of the regiment included the following:
 Colonel John Carter, commandant (1776–1781)
 Colonel Evan Shelby Sr., second colonel (1776–1783)
 Colonel John Sevier, commandant (1781–1783), Lieutenant Colonel (17761781)

See Engagements of the Salisbury District Brigade Regiments for a list of engagements of this regiment.

See also
 List of American Revolutionary War battles
 Southern Campaigns: Pension Transactions for a description of the transcription effort by Will Graves
 Southern theater of the American Revolutionary War
 Washington District, North Carolina, Washington County, Tennessee

References

North Carolina militia
Washington County, North Carolina
Military units and formations established in 1776